Ross Carl Goodman (born February 19, 1970) is an American attorney who is noted for handling high-profile cases. He is the son of Carolyn and Oscar Goodman, who have each served as mayor of his hometown, Las Vegas.

Background
Goodman was born in Las Vegas, Nevada. His father, Oscar Goodman, also an attorney, served as mayor for 12 years; after term limits prevented him from running for office again he was succeeded by his wife Carolyn Goodman. He earned his B.A. at the University of San Diego in 1992, and then his J.D. degree in 1995 from the University of Tulsa College of Law.

In 1992, Goodman was commissioned as a 2nd Lieutenant after completing the Marine Corps' Officer Candidate School in Quantico, VA. He completed the Basic Officer Course, and the Marine Corps Combat Development Command in 1996. He was certified as a Judge Advocate General Corps from the Naval Justice School in Newport, Rhode Island in 1997 and achieved the rank of Major in the U.S. Marine Corps Reserve (USMCR) in 2000 before leaving for private practice.

Career and high-profile cases
Goodman formed Goodman Law Group, P.C. in 2001, a boutique law firm based in Las Vegas, Nevada. Goodman represented parties in multiple high-profile cases, appearing on television shows including Nancy Grace, the Best Defense and truTV (formerly Court TV).

Hells Angels
In 2002, Goodman represented a member of the Hells Angels in a case arising from the infamous Laughlin River Run Riot, where the Hells Angels and Mongols motorcycle clubs engaged in a massive riot resulting in multiple deaths. Goodman's client was dismissed of murder and racketeering charges.

Gloria Guzman
In 2006, Goodman defended Gloria Guzman, a 26-year-old woman accused of drowning her ex-husband Mark Richards, a quadriplegic. Guzman served the minimum sentence of one year and was placed on probation for one year. The murder trial was featured on CNN's Nancy Grace.

David Saxe
Entertainment producer and majority partner of the V Theatre David Saxe enlisted Goodman when his associates made a move to vote him out. After a legal battle Saxe regained control of the theatre.

Jerry Lewis
In 2008, Goodman represented comedian and entertainer Jerry Lewis in a firearms charge. Lewis was charged with carrying a concealed weapon in McCarran International Airport in Las Vegas, Nevada. The case was dismissed and Lewis was released without fines.

Vision Airlines
In 2010, Goodman represented former Vision Airlines employees who were rewarded over five million dollars in back hazard pay for flying CIA, State Department and Blackwater staff to Baghdad and Kabul, which were then considered war zones.

World Fighting Alliance
In 2005, Goodman acquired the World Fighting Alliance (WFA) with partner Louis Palazzo. The WFA, a mixed martial arts (MMA) organization held successful events at the Hard Rock Hotel and Casino in Las Vegas and The Forum in Inglewood. Goodman negotiated the first 30-minute slot on Showtime to feature an MMA organization. Under his management, the WFA acquired top ranked MMA fighters to include future UFC champions, Rich Franklin, Quinton Jackson, and Lyoto Machida, as well as Urijah Faber who became a champion in the WEC. In 2006 Goodman along with partners sold the WFA to the UFC.

Monica Contreras
In 2011, Monica Contreras was allegedly groped in a witness room by a Clark County Family Court marshal. She was at Family Court with her daughter for a separate hearing about her divorce. The act was caught by security cameras, and the two marshals and the hearing master were named the defendants in the lawsuit. Clark County, the state of Nevada and the courts also were named as defendants. Goodman represented Contreras who settled with both the state and county for $200,000.

Crystal Williams
With the help of Ross Goodman, Crystal Williams pressed charges against Steve Rushfield, a Family Court marshals supervisor. She alleges that she was choked by Rushfield while she was restrained in a holding cell in 2010.

Nick Diaz
Atty. Ross Goodman also handled the marijuana case of UFC welterweight contender Nick Diaz. He was supposed to be suspended for 1 year because of taking marijuana metabolites and also for providing false information on his pre-fight questionnaires. In defense, Goodman said that the marijuana metabolites found in Nick's system did not violate the drug use policy of the Nevada State Athletic Commission (NSAC), the state agency that regulates UFC matches. He said that it is "out of competition use" which is permitted by the WADA regulations.

Wanderlei Silva
In late May 2014, Wanderlei Silva admittedly dodged a random UFC drug test. NSAC issued an indefinite suspension against Silva including fines. Ross Goodman, went into new heights to defend Silva. He argued that Silva was not under contract and not a licensee at the time of the test. Goodman insisted that the commission's random drug testing law does not cover non-licensed fighter.

Chael Sonnen
The NSAC has placed a mandatory two-year suspension against Chael Sonnen due to his performance-enhancing drug use. On July 30, the NSAC notified Sonnen that his grappling match in Metamoris 4 violates the terms of the suspension. They threaten that they will sue Sonnen for the violation. In defense, Ross Goodman has sent a series of response letter that challenged the NSAC's definition of competing. Goodman clarifies that jiu-jitsu is not subject to the commission, providing light that Sonnen is free to compete in this type of competition.

Todd Seifert
Todd Seifert, is a tourist from Ohio charged with hit-and-run. He allegedly hit Andrade, a Las Vegas man, who was crossing Las Vegas Boulevard on his way to work. With Goodman's advice and representation, Seifert plead guilty and earned a "lenient sentence".

Kenny Sanchez
Bishop Gorman football coach Kenny Sanchez went to trial in April after being accused of physically abusing Brooke Stewart, his former girlfriend and the mother of his son, during the previous Christmas. Sanchez eventually obtained a 'Not Guilty' verdict after Stewart recanted her previous accusations.

Criticism

Ethics investigation
In February 2004, Robert Rose, an ethics watchdog, filed a complaint with the Nevada Commission on Ethics claiming that during the U.S. Conference of Mayors, Ross's father, former Las Vegas mayor Oscar Goodman, handed out to fellow mayors, conference attendees and other political figures invitations to a cocktail party Goodman was hosting.  Rose alleged that this was nothing more than the mayor abusing his power of office to help promote a business that is owned by his son, Ross Goodman, and Las Vegas Councilman Michael Mack. The Nevada Ethics Commission opened an investigation on April 14, 2004, and on May 13, 2004, the members of the commission found the mayor in ethics violations, although no fine was rendered. Goodman sued the commission and won; the commission's ruling was reversed by the court.

On September 16, 2004, Rose again filed a complaint with the Nevada Commission on Ethics, this time asking the commission to clarify Goodman's affiliation with his son Ross's law firm. In a statement, the mayor explained his name on the letterhead is a way of informing out of state law firms that Ross Goodman is his son. However, a person serving as an elected public official in Nevada may not have his name listed on a law firm letterhead, and Goodman removed his name under protest after several newspaper articles noted the infraction.

On July 18, 2005, the Nevada Commission on Ethics concluded insufficient cause for a hearing and recommended the allegations be dismissed, clearing the elder Goodman of the ethics complaint regarding his name listed as "Of Counsel" to Goodman Law Group.

On September 11, 2007, the Supreme Court of Nevada ruled that Oscar Goodman did not violate any ethics laws during the 2004 cocktail party that he hosted on behalf of his son Ross C. Goodman.

References

External links
 
 Official profile on Lawtally

1970 births
Living people
American businesspeople
Jewish American attorneys
Nevada lawyers
People from Las Vegas
University of San Diego alumni
University of Tulsa College of Law alumni